Ross Milne may refer to:

Ross Milne (politician) (born 1932), Canadian politician
Ross Milne (alpine skier) (1944–1964), Australian alpine skier

See also
Milne (disambiguation)